Jaap ter Linden (born 10 April 1947, in Rotterdam) is a Dutch cellist, viol player and conductor. He specialises in performance of baroque and classical music on authentic instruments.

He began his career as principal cellist of notable baroque orchestras, including Musica Antiqua Köln, The English Concert and Amsterdam Baroque Orchestra. He co-founded the ensemble Musica da Camera, and in 2000 founded the Mozart Akademie in Amsterdam, an orchestra specialising in the classical repertoire, whom he conducts, and with whom he has recorded the complete Mozart symphonies. He has been guest-conductor of both modern and period-instrument orchestras, including the Deutsche Kammerphilharmonie, Portland Baroque Orchestra, European Union Baroque Orchestra, and Philharmonia Baroque Orchestra. He has also conducted opera, including Henry Purcell’s King Arthur and Christoph Willibald Gluck’s Iphigénie en Aulide.
 
He performs chamber music with pianist Ronald Brautigam, violinists Elizabeth Wallfisch, Andrew Manze, and John Holloway, as well as harpsichordists Richard Egarr and Lars Ulrik Mortensen. He has recorded Bach's suites for solo cello twice. With Egarr he has recorded Bach's sonatas for viola da gamba and harpsichord, and with Egarr and Manze, Bach's violin sonatas. With Mortensen and Holloway he has recorded Dieterich Buxtehude's complete chamber music, and with Ton Koopman, Pieter Hellendaal's cello sonatas.

He teaches at the Royal Conservatory of The Hague, at the Amsterdam Conservatory and at the Hochschule für Alte Musik in Würzburg.

External links
 http://www.jaapterlinden.com/ - official website
 Moens-artists.nl: Jaap ter Linden - his agent's webpage

1947 births
Living people
Dutch performers of early music
Dutch viol players
Dutch classical cellists
Dutch conductors (music)
Male conductors (music)
Musicians from Rotterdam
Academic staff of the Conservatorium van Amsterdam
Academic staff of the Royal Conservatory of The Hague
21st-century conductors (music)
21st-century male musicians
21st-century cellists